Kapp Church is a parish church of the Church of Norway in Østre Toten Municipality in Innlandet county, Norway. It is located in the village of Kapp. It is the church for the Kapp parish which is part of the Toten prosti (deanery) in the Diocese of Hamar. The white, wooden church was built in a long church design in 1939 using plans drawn up by the architect Henry Bucher. The church seats about 167 people.

History
Planning for a new church in Kapp began during the 1930s. Henry Bucher was hired to design the new church. Construction began in the spring of 1937, led by carpenter Karl Johnsen Kjæsarud. Johan Mortensen performed the plumbing work, Asbjørn Moe did painting work, and Per Johnsen was responsible for electrical installations. The new building was consecrated on 14 May 1939. The church has a rectangular nave and a narrower chancel surrounded by sacristies to the north and south. There is a tower on the roof at the west end of the nave. Originally, it was an annex chapel and more recently it was upgraded to become a parish church.

Media gallery

See also
List of churches in Hamar

References

Østre Toten
Churches in Innlandet
Churches in Toten Deanery
Long churches in Norway
Wooden churches in Norway
20th-century Church of Norway church buildings
Churches completed in 1939
1939 establishments in Norway